Norodom Arunrasmy (born 2 October 1955) is a Cambodian princess, politician, and diplomat. She is the youngest daughter of HM King Father Norodom Sihanouk and stepdaughter of Queen Mother Norodom Monineath. Her birth mother is Mam Manivan Phanivong, a Lao woman who was born in Vientiane, Laos and married King Sihanouk in 1949.

Life and career
Arunrasmy attended primary school at the Petit Lycée Descartes in Phnom Penh, Cambodia, and attended secondary school at the Dominican International School in Taipei, Taiwan. In the 1980s she began her professional career in banking, working at the Bank of California in Long Beach, and later Siam Commercial Bank in New York. After the Paris Peace Accords, Arunrasmay became deputy director and then director of Cambodian Agricultural Bank from 1992–1997. She was also a member of the Cambodian Red Cross Committee and member of the ASEAN Women's Association (ASEAN Ladies Circle).
 
She was selected as the Funcinpec party candidate for the 2008 Cambodian parliamentary elections, she was the Cambodian Ambassador to Malaysia from 2005 to 2018 before being nominated to the Senate by King Norodom Sihamoni.

Her Highness is fluent in Khmer, French, Lao, Thai and English languages.

Family
Arunrasmy married Major Prince Sisowath Sirirath in 1970, with whom she had three children: Sisowath Nakia, Sisowath Nando and Sisowath Sirikith Nathalie. They divorced in 1991, and she then married Keo Puth Rasmey, with whom she had two children.

References

External links

 Norodom
 – Statement by HRH Princess SAMDECH Norodom

1955 births
Cambodian princesses
Living people
Commandeurs of the Légion d'honneur
Children of prime ministers of Cambodia
Cambodian people of Laotian descent
Knights Grand Cross of the Royal Order of Cambodia
Members of the Senate (Cambodia)
Members of the Royal Order of Monisaraphon
Daughters of kings